Gamma 4 is Gamma's fourth and final album and was originally released on Ronnie Montrose's own label, RoMoCo, in 2000. In 2005, it was re-released by Wounded Bird Records.

Track listing 
All credits adapted from the original release.
 "Darkness to Light" (Ronnie Montrose, Davey Pattison) – 5:35 
 "Love Will Find You" (Montrose, CJ Hutchins) – 4:18 
 "Resurrection Shuffle" (Tony Ashton) – 4:36 
 "Oh No You Don't!" (Montrose) – 4:30 
 "Bad Reputation" (Montrose, Pattison) – 4:05 
 "Last Man on Earth" (Montrose) – 7:55 
 "The Only One" (Montrose, Pattison) – 3:52 
 "Out of These Hands" (Montrose, Hutchins) – 5:24 
 "Prayers" (Montrose, Pattison) – 3:36 
 "The Low Road Home" (Montrose, Pattison) – 6:33

Personnel 
 Davey Pattison – vocals
 Ronnie Montrose – guitar, producer, guitars and keyboards engineer
 Ed Roth – keyboards
 Glenn Letsch – bass
 Denny Carmassi – drums

Additional musicians
 Edgar Winter – saxophone on tracks 3 and 4
 Jim Gammon – trumpet on tracks 3 and 4
 Marc Bonilla – horn arrangements on tracks 3 and 4
 Lisa Battle – background vocals on track 8
 Jean-Michel Byron – background vocals on tracks 2 and 8
 Michele Montrose – percussion on track 7, background vocals on track 9, artwork

Production
Troy Lucketta – basic tracks engineer
Andy Martin, David Culiner – assistant engineers
Michael Scott – mixing
Steve Hall – mastering at Future Disc, Hollywood

References 

Gamma (band) albums
2000 albums
Wounded Bird Records albums